Harris Tweed was a British comic strip series, fully named Harris Tweed, Special Agent, later retitled Harris Tweed - Super Sleuth, which appeared in the British comic strip magazine The Eagle (1950–1962). The strip was drawn by John Ryan and centered on a monocled, rotund, bumbling secret agent, Harris Tweed, who, along with his far more capable boy sidekick, simply known as "Boy", managed to get into all manner of scrapes, somehow always managing to make good in the end.

References 

1950 comics debuts
1962 comics endings
Spy comics
Humor comics
Eagle comic strips